Athlétic Club Léopards de Dolisie is a football (soccer) club from the Republic of Congo based in Dolisie, Niari Department.

Honours
Congo Premier League
Winner (4): 2012, 2013, 2016, 2017.
Runners-up (3): 2009, 2010, 2011.

Coupe du Congo
Winner (5): 2009, 2011, 2013, 2016, 2017.
Runners-up (2): 2012, 2015.

Super Coupe du Congo
Winner (2): 2009, 2011.

CAF Confederation Cup
Winner (1): 2012.

Performance in CAF competitions

External links
 ''
FootballDatabase.eu
Footballzz.co.uk
National-Football-Teams.com

 
Football clubs in the Republic of the Congo
Association football clubs established in 1953
Niari Department
1953 establishments in Moyen-Congo
CAF Confederation Cup winning clubs